Malakhit Marine Engineering Bureau is a company based in Saint Petersburg, Russia. It is a subsidiary of the United Shipbuilding Corporation.

Malakhit has designed nuclear-powered attack submarines including the November, Victor, Alfa, Akula, Yasen and the Laika classes. Malakhit also designs torpedo tubes and submarine missile armament complexes. In addition it designs small submersibles for intelligence collection, deep-diving oceanographic research and rescue, and commercial applications.

See also
Rubin Design Bureau

References

External links
 Official website

Manufacturing companies of Russia
Companies based in Saint Petersburg
United Shipbuilding Corporation
Shipbuilding companies of the Soviet Union
Ministry of the Shipbuilding Industry (Soviet Union)
Design bureaus